Abracadabra is an incantation used by stage magicians, and formerly in Gnosticism and ancient Roman medicine.

Abracadabra, abra cadabra or abra kadabra may also refer to:

Music
Abra Cadabra, a British rapper
Abracadabra (ABC album)
Abracadabra (Buck-Tick album)
Abracadabra (Claire Hamill album)
Abracadabra (Florent Pagny album)
Abracadabra (Steve Miller Band album)
"Abracadabra" (Steve Miller Band song)
"Abracadabra" (Brown Eyed Girls song)
"Abra-ca-dabra", a 1973 single by The DeFranco Family
"Abracadabra", a 2011 song by Jessie J from Who You Are

Film
Abracadabra (1952 film), a 1952 Italian film
Abracadabra (2017 film), a 2017 Spanish-French film
Abracadabra (2019 film), a 2019 Indonesian-Singaporean film
 Abra Cadabra (film), a 1983 Australian animated feature

Other uses
Abracadabra (video game), 1988 game
 Abra Kadabra (character), a DC Comics supervillain
Goodliffe's Abracadabra, a weekly magic magazine that closed in 2009
Theora mesopotamica, a species of bivalve mollusc, previously named Abra cadabra
 Abra, Kadabra, and Alakazam, characters in the Pokémon video game franchise
 "Abra Kadabra" (The Flash episode), an episode of The Flash
 Abra Kadabra (Arrowverse), a character appearing on the Arrowverse

See also
 Abrahadabra, a magical formula in Thelema
 Avada kedavra, the "Killing Curse" in the Harry Potter novel series
 Cadabra (disambiguation)